The 2013 Fayetteville mayoral election took place on November 5, 2013 to elect the mayor of Fayetteville, North Carolina. It saw the election of Nat Robertson.

Incumbent mayor Tony Chavonne did not seek reelection to a fifth term.

Results

Primary
The primary was held October 8, 2013.

General election

References

2013
2013 North Carolina elections
2013 United States mayoral elections